Sangar Rural District may refer to:
 Sangar Rural District (Gilan Province)
 Sangar Rural District (North Khorasan Province)